is a Japanese politician of the Liberal Democratic Party, a member of the House of Representatives in the Diet (national legislature).

Biography 
A native of Kitakyūshū, Fukuoka he attended Waseda University as both undergraduate and graduate students.

In 2003, he was elected to the Diet for the first time.

References

External links 
 Official website in Japanese

1960 births
Living people
People from Kitakyushu
Waseda University alumni
Members of the House of Representatives (Japan)
Liberal Democratic Party (Japan) politicians
Environment ministers of Japan
21st-century Japanese politicians